Rainer Penkert (23 June 1921 – 11 April 2012, in Munich) was a German actor.

Selected filmography

 Our Miss Doctor (1940) - Bierlinger, Primaner
 Menschen in Gottes Hand (1948) - Karl Renken
 Anonymous Letters (1949) - Axel Brackmann
 The Cuckoos (1949) - Hanno Gersdorf
 Der fallende Stern (1950) - von Aster
 Die Sehnsucht des Herzens (1951) - Richard Sturm
 Toxi (1952) - Robert Peters
 Ein Herz spielt falsch (1953) - Dr. Neumeister
 08/15 (1954) - Leutnant Weldermann
  (1955) - Oberleutnant Weldermann
 Urlaub auf Ehrenwort (1955) - Sanitätsgefreiter Hagen
 We're All Necessary (1956)
 Kitty und die große Welt (1956) - Hopkins
 Embajadores en el infierno (1956) - Obermayer
  (1957) - Leutnant Hans Dierkens
  (1957) - Funker
 Stefanie (1958) - Hannes Gonthar
 Wir Wunderkinder (1958) - Cabaret artist (uncredited)
 Der Rest ist Schweigen (1959) - Major Horace
 Kapetan Lesi (1960) - Ahmet Lesi
 Der Rächer (1960) - Cinematographer
 Stefanie in Rio (1960) - Hannes Gonthar
 La rivolta degli schiavi (1960) - Massimo

 Beloved Impostor (1961) - Schiffszahlmeister
 The Longest Day (1962) - Leutnant Fritz Theen (uncredited)
 He Can't Stop Doing It (1962) - Lord Gilbert Darroway
 Morituri (1965) - Milkereit
 The Heathens of Kummerow (1967) - Grambauer / Narrator
 Peter und Sabine (1968) - Herr Miller
 Madame and Her Niece (1969) - Jochen Reiter
 Cardillac (1969)
 What Have You Done to Solange? (1972) - Mr. Leach, the headmaster
 Hausfrauen-Report 3.Teil - Alle Jahre wieder-wenn aus blutjungen Mädchen blutjunge Hausfrauen werden (1972) - Dr. Richard Bronner
 Paper Tiger (1975) - Army Colonel
 Es muss nicht immer Kaviar sein (1977) - Lovejoy
 Das Spinnennetz (1989) - Von Badewitz

External links
 
 Obituary - German magazine Film-Dienst, The June-edition, Headline : "Personen"
 Obituary - Sueddeutsche Zeitung

1921 births
2012 deaths
German male film actors
German male television actors
Male actors from Berlin